Proturentomon is a genus of proturans in the family Protentomidae, found in the Holarctic.

Species
 Proturentomon chinense Yin, 1984
 Proturentomon condei Nosek, 1967
 Proturentomon discretum Condé, 1961
 Proturentomon dorae Najt & Vidal Sarmiento, 1972
 Proturentomon iowaense Womersley, 1938
 Proturentomon kubikovae Rusek, 1975
 Proturentomon minimum (Berlese, 1908)
 Proturentomon nitrarius Najt & Vidal Sarmiento, 1972
 Proturentomon noseki Rusek, 1975
 Proturentomon pectinatum (Condé, 1948)
 Proturentomon picardi Condé, 1960
 Proturentomon pilosum Rusek, 1975
 Proturentomon stebaevae Szeptycki, 1988

References

Protura